The 1962 Southern Conference men's basketball tournament took place from March 1–3, 1962 at the Richmond Arena in Richmond, Virginia. The West Virginia Mountaineers, led by head coach George King, won their seventh Southern Conference title and received the automatic berth to the 1962 NCAA tournament.

Format
The top eight finishers  of the conference's nine members were eligible for the tournament. Teams were seeded based on conference winning percentage. The tournament used a preset bracket consisting of three rounds.

Bracket

* Overtime game

See also
List of Southern Conference men's basketball champions

References

Tournament
Southern Conference men's basketball tournament
Southern Conference men's basketball tournament
Southern Conference men's basketball tournament